Hyles centralasiae, the eastern foxtail-lily hawkmoth, is a moth of the family Sphingidae. The species was first described by Otto Staudinger in 1887. It is found from eastern Turkey and Armenia east across northern Iraq, northern Iran, southern Turkmenistan, the mountainous areas of eastern Uzbekistan and southern Kazakhstan to Tajikistan, Kyrgyzstan, Afghanistan and northern Xinjiang in China.

The wingspan is 60–75 mm. It resembles a very pale Hyles euphorbiae euphorbiae, but the pale median stripe extends to the costa and is broken only twice, basally and centrally. The first segment of the foretarsus is also shorter, with fewer, longer spines.

The larvae have been recorded on the flower and seed heads of Eremurus in Tajikistan and Afghanistan. If this is the only food plant, it cannot have a second generation on this host plant, which flowers only in spring. However, adults have been captured in August and September, as well as July. Either such individuals belong to a generation doomed to perish without reproducing, they are part of a very late spring brood or there is another autumn-flowering food plant.

References

Hyles (moth)
Moths described in 1887
Insects of Turkey